Karen Souza (born January 10, 1984) is an Argentinian jazz and bossa nova singer, songwriter, and producer.

Career 
Souza began her career by providing vocals for producers of electronic music. Under pseudonyms she sang versions of hits songs from the 70s, 80s, and 90s, such as "Creep"  by Radiohead and "Do You Really Want to Hurt Me" by Culture Club. Her version of "Creep" was used in the film The Zero Theorem (2013). In 2010, she performed at Blue Note Tokyo and signed a contract with JVC Victor in Japan. She has toured in Venezuela, Brazil, Mexico, China, Korea, Spain, and Italy.

Discography 
 Essentials (Music Brokers, 2011)
 Hotel Souza (Music Brokers, 2012)
 Essentials II (Music Brokers, 2014)
 Velvet Vault (Music Brokers, 2017)
 Language of Love (Victor, 2020)

References

External links 
 

1980 births
Living people
21st-century Argentine singers
Argentine jazz singers
Dance musicians